The ninth season of the Russian reality talent show The Voice Kids which premiered on 18 February 2022 and finished on 29 April 2022 on Channel One. Dmitry Nagiev and Agata Muceniece returned as the show's presenters. Basta and Egor Kreed returned as a coach were joined by Polina Gagarina, who returned as a coach after a one-season break and replased LOBODA. Adelia  Zagrebina was announced the winner of the season, marking Egor Kreed's first win as a coach.

Coaches and presenters

Basta and Egor Kreed returned as coaches and were joined by Polina Gagarina, who returned as a coach after a one-season break.

Dmitry Nagiev and Agata Muceniece returned as the show's presenters.

Teams
Colour key

Blind Auditions 
Blind auditions started on 18 February. As like previous season, each coach has to complete its team with fifteen contestants.

The Battles 
The Battles start on April 1, 2022. Contestants who won their battle advanced to the Sing-off rounds.
Colour key

The Sing-offs 
The Sing-offs started on April 1. Contestants who was saved by their coaches advanced to the Final.
Colour key

Live shows
Colour key

Week 1: Live Playoffs (April 22)
As with season 2, each coach saved three artists who were eliminated in the Sing-offs. Playoff results were voted on in real time. Nine artists sang live and six of them were eliminated by the end of the night. Three saved artists advanced to the Final.

Week 2: Final (April 29)

Best Coach
Colour key

Notes

References

9
2022 Russian television seasons